Iza is a town located in the province and autonomous community of Navarre, northern Spain. Sixteen villages belong to this municipality: Aguinaga, Aldaba, Aldaz, Áriz, Atondo, Cía, Erice, Gulina, Iza, Larumbe, Lete, Ochovi, Ordériz, Sarasa, Sarasate y Zuasti.

In 2017 it had 1192 inhabitants (INE).

References

External links
 IZA in the Bernardo Estornés Lasa - Auñamendi Encyclopedia (Euskomedia Fundazioa) 

Municipalities in Navarre